Bonnie Arnold is an American film producer and executive who has worked at Walt Disney Feature Animation, Pixar Animation Studios and DreamWorks Animation. Arnold was born in Atlanta, Georgia and rose to prominence in Hollywood during the initial wave of computer-animation.

Life and career 
Arnold has a B.S. in journalism from the University of Georgia and a M.S. in journalism from Boston University.  Her interest in journalism led her to her first professional assignment as unit publicist for American Playhouse's debut production, King of America.: Arnold's first job on a Hollywood feature was as production coordinator for Neil Simon's The Slugger's Wife, a 1984 film shot in Atlanta and produced by Ray Stark, who was responsible for many of Simon and Barbra Streisand's movie hits. "I got a real sense of filmmaking the Hollywood way," Arnold recalls. : From there, she freelanced in film production in Atlanta and met producer David Picker, who invited her to work at Columbia Pictures in Los Angeles. While working on a Tony Scott movie called Revenge at Columbia, Bonnie met Kevin Costner and ended up joining the Dances with Wolves production as associate producer. In 1992, Bonnie was recruited by Peter Schneider and John Lasseter to work on Toy Story for Disney. When Toy Story became a box office smash, she produced Tarzan, overseeing a crew of 1,100 and a $130 million budget—four and a third times that of Toy Story. In 2001, after she finished Tarzan, Jeffrey Katzenberg invited Bonnie to produce Over the Hedge at DreamWorks Animation.

Bonnie continues to work on the How to Train Your Dragon franchise, for which she has received a Golden Globe Award and two Academy Award nominations.

After DreamWorks saw a series of financially disappointing films, DreamWorks Animation named Arnold co-president of feature animation in early 2015. Along with Mireille Soria, she is tasked with overseeing creative development and production of DWA's theatrical releases. In 2016, Soria stepped down from her role as co-president to return to producing, leaving Arnold the sole president of feature animation.

To date, Arnold's films have grossed over $2.2 billion at the box office. She serves on the Dean's advisory board of Boston University's School of Communications and on the Board of Counselors at USC's Annenberg School of Communications, as well as being a mentor for the Peter Stark Producing Program at USC. In addition, she is a member of the Academy of Motion Picture Arts and Sciences and the British Academy of Film and Television Arts.

Filmography

Personal life

Arnold resides in Santa Monica with her husband and daughter, Lily. Her favorite hobbies include playing tennis and reading anything by Mississippi writer Eudora Welty. She credits her interest in family movies to her mother, a teacher and avid film buff who often took her and her brother to watch movies at a theater where her uncle worked as a projectionist.

References

External links 

Businesspeople from Atlanta
University of Georgia alumni
American film producers
Living people
DreamWorks Animation people
Boston University College of Communication alumni
Pixar people
Walt Disney Animation Studios people
American women film producers
Year of birth missing (living people)